Kaustav Banerjee from the University of California, Santa Barbara was named Fellow of the Institute of Electrical and Electronics Engineers (IEEE) in 2012 for contributions to modeling and design of nanoscale integrated circuit interconnects.

References

Fellow Members of the IEEE
Living people
Year of birth missing (living people)
Place of birth missing (living people)
University of California, Santa Barbara faculty
Fellows of the American Physical Society
American electrical engineers